Daniszewo  is a village in the administrative district of Gmina Bulkowo, within Płock County, Masovian Voivodeship, in east-central Poland. It was created by grandfather of Szymon Daniszewski.

References

Villages in Płock County